Wojnowo may refer to:

Wojnowo, Golub-Dobrzyń County in Kuyavian-Pomeranian Voivodeship (north-central Poland)
Wojnowo, Bydgoszcz County in Kuyavian-Pomeranian Voivodeship (north-central Poland)
Wojnowo, Greater Poland Voivodeship (west-central Poland)
Wojnowo, Lubusz Voivodeship (west Poland)
Wojnowo, Warmian-Masurian Voivodeship (north Poland)
Wojnowo, West Pomeranian Voivodeship (north-west Poland)